Two ships of the United States Navy have been named USS Bronstein in honor of Ben Richard Bronstein, Assistant Surgeon, who was killed in action 28 February 1942.

 , was a destroyer escort commissioned on 13 December 1943.
 , was a frigate commissioned on 16 Jun 1963.

References

United States Navy ship names